Glezen may refer to:

Glezen, Indiana
Glezen Glacier